Desideria may refer to:

People
Queen Desideria of Sweden and Norway, formerly Désirée Clary (1777–1860)
Desideria Quintanar de Yáñez (1814–1893), the first woman baptized into The Church of Jesus Christ of Latter-day Saints in Mexico
Desideria Ocampo Arriola (1861–1910), first lady of Guatemala
"La Desideria", nickname of Chilean actress Ana González Olea (1915–2008)

Other
Desideria e l'Anello del Drago, also known as The Dragon Ring, an Italian mini-series
Jocara desideria, a species of moth
Solms-laubachia himalayensis, also known as Desideria himalayensis, a flowering plant